Matthew and Son is a 1984 Australian television film about a single parent who is a police surgeon. It was filmed May to June 1984 and is a pilot for a TV series that never eventuated.

Nicole Kidman appears in a small role.

Production
The film was one of several projects Paul Cronin made when at Channel Ten, and was done for Johnny Young's company. Cronin:
It was based on the life of Dr John Birrell, the police surgeon, who was instrumental in the .05 and seatbelt legislation. A fascinating man - I met him, and he was a great character to play. Ten Brisbane, Ten Melbourne and Ten Adelaide committed to a series - they had a 7:30 timeslot allocated for it and all - and the only fly in the ointment was Ten Sydney. They would not commit. The telemovie rated well when it did go to air. It was a very, very well constructed show, but Johnny's company collapsed after that, and I left channel Ten.

References

External links

Australian television films
1984 films
1980s English-language films